Voghji is a village in the Amasia Municipality of the Shirak Province of Armenia.

In 1988-1989, Azerbaijanis of the village moved to Azerbaijan, leading to Armenians from the Ninotsminda region of Georgia, the Spitak earthquake zone, and Azerbaijan to settle in the village.

Demographics 
According to 1912 publication of Kavkazskiy kalendar, there was a mainly Karapapakh population of 930 in the village of Okhchoglu of the Kars Okrug of the Kars Oblast.

The population of the village since 1886 is as follows:

Gallery

References 

Populated places in Shirak Province